Koror is the state comprising the main commercial centre of the Republic of Palau.  It consists of several islands, the most prominent being Koror Island (also Oreor Island). It is Palau’s most populous state.

History
In the oral tradition of Palau, Koror is one of the children of Milad, and thus occupies an important position in traditional belief. In addition, Koror is the home of the clan of the Ibedul, the high chief of Palau. 

Several traditional villages in Koror span the volcanic and rock island portions. Many of the stone platforms , odesongel, serve as clan cemeteries, and other stone features serve as shrines. The lagoon is an important resource area, and was probably intensively exploited prehistorically. 

The first sighting of Koror, Babeldaob, and Peleliu recorded by Westerners was by the Spanish expedition of Ruy López de Villalobos at the end of January, 1543. They were then charted as Los Arrecifes (The Reefs in Spanish). In November and December 1710 these three islands were again visited and explored by a Spanish missionary expedition commanded by Sargento Mayor Francisco Padilla on board the patache Santísima Trinidad. 

Two years later they were explored in detail by the expedition of Spanish naval officer Bernardo de Egoy. He was part of the Captaincy General of the Philippines, dependent on the Viceroyalty of New Spain. In 1919 it became the capital of the South Seas Mandate.  On 7 October 2006, Ngerulmud replaced Koror as Palau's capital city.

Geography 
The state of Koror (population 11,444 ) contains about 65% of the population of the country.  The nation's 
former capital and largest town, also called Koror or Koror City, is located here.

Besides Koror City and the town of Meyuns, there are a total of 11 hamlets in the state of Koror:
Dngeronger
Idid
Ikelau
Iyebukel
Medalaii
Meketii
Ngarkesoal
Ngerbeched (Capital)
Ngerchemai
Ngerkebesang
Ngermid

Koror State stretches across a large portion of the lagoon extending from Babeldaob Island on the north almost to Beliliou Island to the south. Though widely spread, the actual land mass of Koror is not great and consists of hundreds of islands and islets including most of the fabled Rock Islands of Palau. Koror encompasses perhaps the most varied range of geography in Micronesia with many different kinds of physical and social settings. In the northern part of the state are three volcanic islands: Oreor, Ngerekebesang, and Ngemelachel.

Across Oreor Island, the intensive land use in the last two centuries has radically altered the land's shape. Most vegetation has been cleared for house construction or put into gardens. Steep slopes have dense secondary growth brush. On Ngerekebesang Island, the land use has not been quite as intense and areas on the northwest coast contain stands of volcanic island forest. To the south, the rock islands offer a landscape that appears out of this world. The rock islands consist of uplifted coralline limestone reef with shear cliffs rising above a characteristic sea-level notch. Small beaches have formed in a few coves and provide access to the interiors. The ground is not covered by soil, but instead consists of dog-toothed sharp chunks of reef which have broken off of the crags and spires jutting skyward in an unpredictable maze. The islands are covered by a rock island forest and vines clinging to crevices in the limestone. In places, sinkholes contain marine lakes, and in other places the sinkholes contain wind-blown soil.

Presently, most land in Koror is involved in urban development with gardens interspersed with houses and business. The rock islands offer valuable areas for exploiting the rich lagoon, and for the development of the tourist industry.

Koror was formerly the capital of the South Seas Mandate, a League of Nations mandated territory administered by the Empire of Japan.

Demography
In 2015, of the 17,661 people living in Palau, 65% or 11,444 lived in Koror State. The median age was 33.5 years. The official languages of the state are Palauan and English.

Education 

Schools in Koror operated by the Ministry of Education include:
 Palau High School
 Koror Elementary School—it opened in 1945 after World War II. The current building opened in 1969 as Typhoon Sally destroyed the previous one.
 George B. Harris Elementary School in eastern Koror—named after a member of the Land Registration Team of Palau, it was built in 1964 to relieve Koror Elementary.
 Meyuns Elementary School in Meyuns—it was built circa 1969 and expanded in 1973. It was established since Typhoon Sally destroyed Koror Elementary, where Meyuns students previously attended. The Trust Territory of the Pacific Islands administration was previously uninterested in building a school in Melyuns.

Economy
Belau Air has its headquarters in Koror, as did the short-lived Pacific Flier in 2010.

Tourism
Much of Palau's economy comes from tourism. The Rock Islands of Palau are all located in the state. Scuba diving shops and facilities are located all over Koror. Accommodation like hotels, bars, restaurants, cafes, and resorts are all available. Dolphins Pacific, the world's largest dolphin research facility, is open for tourists who are interested in swimming and interacting with trained dolphins. Most tourists to Palau stay in Koror, which is the centre for Palau's resort services and house modern conveniences. Koror has businesses that cater to speakers of many languages.

By 2001, the Koror Jail, Palau's only correctional facility, has become a tourist destination thanks to inmates who create and sell elaborate wooden storyboards at a retail facility located on the jail's grounds.

The jail consists of three structures, and it is surrounded by an eight-foot wire mesh fence and an eight-foot concrete wall.

Political system
The state of Koror has an elected chief executive, governor. The state also has a legislature elected every four years. The state population elects one of the members of the House of Delegates of Palau.

Transport 
The island of Koror is connected by bridges to three neighbouring islands:

 Ngerekebesang Island, the site of Palau's second-largest town, Meyuns, in the eastern part of the island, with a population of 1,200.
 Malakal Island, the site of Koror's port.
 Koror Island is also connected by the Koror–Babeldaob Bridge to the state of Airai in the island of Babeldaob, where Palau International Airport is located.
A main road extends through Koror along the central ridge, from the Koror-Babeldaob Bridge on the east to its western end in Medalaii. A network of secondary roads extends throughout the residential areas, and causeways connect Koror to Ngerekebesang and Ngemelachel Islands. Docking facilities are found on the northern coast in Meketii and on the southern coast in Medalaii. The major harbor facility for Palau is located on the east side of Ngemelachel Island. Malakal Harbor offers a sheltered, deep-water anchorage and has been in continual use since the 1840s. Most goods found in the many stores throughout Palau come through this port.

Climate 
Koror features a tropical rainforest climate under the Köppen climate classification.

Notable residents 
Abba Thulle
Franco Gibbons
Ibedul Gibbons
John C. Gibbons
Prince Lee Boo (1764-1784)
Ruby Joy Gabriel, Olympic Track and Field athlete
Yositaka Adachi

See also
Sacred Heart Church, Koror

Notes

References

External links

Koror State Government
Koror State – PalauGov.pw

 
States of Palau
Islands of Palau
Former national capitals

Malakal, Palau